Deir Qaddis is a Palestinian town in the Ramallah and al-Bireh Governorate of the State of Palestine, in the central West Bank, located sixteen kilometers west of Ramallah. According to the Palestinian Central Bureau of Statistics, the town had a population of approximately 1,942 inhabitants in 2007. The town consists of 8,207 dunams, of which 438 dunams are classified as built-up area. As a result of 1995 accords, 7.7% of Deir Qaddis' land was transferred to the Palestinian National Authority for civil affairs, so-called Area B, but Israel still retains full control of 92.3% of the town, being in Area C.

Location

History
Deir Qaddis means the "monastery of the saint". French explorer Victor Guérin found in the Kharbet (=ruin) Deir Kaddis remains of houses built with large blocks and several cisterns dug into the rock, while SWP  (1882) notes a ruined monastery and cave near by the village, and that the name of the village indicates that a convent once existed here.

Ottoman era
The village was incorporated into the Ottoman Empire in 1517 with all of Palestine, and in 1596 it appeared in the tax registers    as Dayr Qiddis in the Nahiya of Ramlah of the Liwa of Gazza.  It had a population of 11 households, all Muslim, and paid taxes on wheat, barley, summer crops, olive- and fruit trees,   goats and beehives, and a press for olives or grapes; a total of  5,400  akçe.

No  sherds from the early Ottoman era have been found here. In 1838  Deir el-Kaddis  was noted as a  village,   located in the Beni Hasan area, west of Jerusalem.

In 1863 Guérin  estimated that Deir Kaddis had about 350 inhabitants, while an Ottoman village list of about 1870 showed Der Kaddis had 36 houses and a population of 112, though the population count included only the men.   

In 1883, the PEF's Survey of Western Palestine described Deir el Kuddis as a "small hamlet on a high hill-top, with gardens to the north [..] There is a well on the east."

British Mandate era
In the 1922 census of Palestine, conducted by the British Mandate authorities, Dair Qaddis had a population of 299 inhabitants, all Muslims,   increasing in the 1931 census to a population of 368, still all Muslim, in 82 houses.

In the 1945 statistics, the population of Deir Qaddis was 440 Muslims, with 8,224 dunams of land, according to an official land and population survey. 1,815 dunams were used for plantations and irrigable land, 1,069 dunams for cereals, while 8 dunams were built-up (urban) land.

Jordanian era
In the wake of the 1948 Arab–Israeli War,  Deir Qaddis came  under Jordanian rule.

The Jordanian census of 1961 found 752 inhabitants in Deir Qaddis.

Post-1967
Deir Qaddis came under Israeli occupation during the 1967 Six-Day War. The population in the 1967 census conducted by the Israeli authorities was 461, 25 of whom originated from the Israeli territory. 

After the 1995 accords, 7.7% of the village's total area has been classified as Area B land, while the remaining 93.3% is Area C.

According to ARIJ, Israel has confiscated land from Deir Qaddis in order to construct three Israeli settlements: 
1818 dunams for Modi'in Illit,
446 dunams for Nili,
471 dunams for Na'aleh.

Part of the village land was separated from Deir Qaddis after Israel finished the Israeli West Bank barrier in 2008. The first time the villagers were given permission to access their land behind the barrier was in 2012. 

The town today contains a mosque, three schools (two primary and one secondary), two medical clinics and a sports club.  

The town's prominent families are Husain, Qattosa, Nasser, Abu Zeid, Hamada, Awadh, Abu Laban and Kreish.

References

Bibliography

External links
Welcome To Dayr Qaddis
Survey of Western Palestine, Map 14:  IAA, Wikimedia commons 
 Deir Qaddis Fact sheet,  Applied Research Institute–Jerusalem (ARIJ)
Deir Qaddis profile, ARIJ
Deir Qaddis aerial photo, ARIJ
Locality Development Priorities and Needs in Deir Qaddis Village, ARIJ
 The Expansion of Kiryat Sefer Settlement on the Land of Dier 27, February, 1997, POICA
 The Israeli Occupation Milling of a Road Designated for "Military Purposes" Deir Qaddis – Ramallah Governorate 01, June, 2011, POICA
   “Israeli Piracy During the Daylight” The Israeli Bulldozers Started to Razing Lands in Deir Qiddis in order to loot more than 100 dunums of Deir Qiddis lands southwest of Ramallah  02, June, 2011,  POICA

Villages in the West Bank
Municipalities of the State of Palestine